Jason A. Monks (born in Ridgecrest, California) is an American politician serving as a member of the Idaho House of Representatives from District 22. Monks formerly served as Assistant Majority Leader for the Idaho House of Representatives until 2023.

Education
Monks earned his Bachelor of Science degree from Brigham Young University.

Elections

District 22B

2020 
Monks defeated Hedi Sorenon in the Republican primary with 61.51% of the vote. Monks faces Nina Turner in the general election.

2018 
Monks defeated Ronald DeBlauw in the Republican primary with 68% of the vote. Monks was unopposed in the general election.

2016 
Monks was unopposed in the Republican primary and the general election.

Monks supported Ted Cruz in the Republican Party presidential primaries, 2016.

2014 

Monks was unopposed in the Republican primary and the general election.

2012 

With Republican Representative Pete Nielsen redistricted to 23B.

Monks won the four-way Republican Primary with 942 votes (39.7%), defeating former Representative Fred Tilman.

Monks won the General election with 10,080 votes (67.6%) against Democratic nominee Sharon Fisher.

Mayor of Meridian

2010 

Monks ran for mayor of Meridian, Idaho losing to Tammy de Weerd.

References

External links
Jason Monks at the Idaho Legislature
Campaign site

Year of birth missing (living people)
Living people
Brigham Young University alumni
Republican Party members of the Idaho House of Representatives
People from Ridgecrest, California
People from Nampa, Idaho
21st-century American politicians